is a Japanese alpine skier. She competed in slalom and giant slalom at the 1998 Winter Olympics in Nagano.

References

External links
 Official JOC profile 

1974 births
Living people
Japanese female alpine skiers
Olympic alpine skiers of Japan
Alpine skiers at the 1998 Winter Olympics